The 2019 NCAA Skiing Championships took place from March 6 to March 9 in Vermont, at the Trapp Family Lodge, which hosted the cross-country events, and the Stowe Mountain Resort, which hosted the alpine events. The tournament went into its 66th consecutive NCAA Skiing Championships, and featured twenty-four teams across all divisions.

Team results

 Note: Top 10 only
 (H): Team from hosting U.S. state

Individual Results

 Note: Table does not include consolation
 (H): Individual from hosting U.S. State

References

2019 in American sports
2019 in sports in Vermont